"Viens M'embrasser" is a 1981 French-language song by Julio Iglesias.

Other versions
 Julio Iglesias recorded this song in English, with the title "So Close To Me".
 Julio Iglesias recorded this song in Spanish, with the title "Abrázame".
 The song has been covered in Vietnamese by famous artist Ngoc Lan, known by the title "Lại Gần Hôn Em" – a direct translation of the song's title.

References

1981 songs
1981 singles
Julio Iglesias songs
French-language songs